Mike Richmond (born February 26, 1948 in Philadelphia) is an American jazz bassist.

Richmond started on guitar then picked up bass in his early teens. He attended Temple University (1965–1970), studying with Edward Arian from the Philadelphia Orchestra. After lessons with Jimmy Garrison in the early 1970s he began performing with Chico Hamilton and Arnie Lawrence, also working with Stan Getz, Jack DeJohnette, Horace Silver, Joe Henderson, Lee Konitz, Hubert Laws, Franco Ambrosetti, Dannie Richmond, Gil Evans, Art Farmer, Woody Herman, and George Gruntz.

Starting in 1980, Richmond devoted time to learning the sitar, traveling to Madras, India and performing live with Ravi Shankar. He led Mingus Dynasty (replacing Mingus) from 1980–1985, and began teaching at New York University in 1988 (Teacher of the Year, 1991 & 1994).

Richmond won a Grammy Award for Miles & Quincy Live at Montreux. His book Modern Walking Bass Technique is used internationally.

Discography

As leader
 For Us (SteepleChase, 1978) with Andy LaVerne
 Dream Waves (Inner City) (1978)
 Colours of a Dream (International Phonograph) (1980)
 Prayer for Peace (Moers) (1985)
 Basic Tendencies (Nomad) (1988)
 Light Blues (Polygram/Amadeo) (1988)
 On the Edge (SteepleChase) (1988)
 Dance for Andy (SteepleChase) (1989)
 New Blues (Nuba) (1993)
 Blue in Green (SteepleChase) (1994)
The Pendulum (SteepleChase, 2016)
Tones For Joan's Bones (SteepleChase) (2017)
La vie en rose (SteepleChase) (2018)
Bill's Hit Tunes (Ride Symbol Records) (2019)

As sideman
With Franco Ambrosetti
Close Encounter (Enja, 1979) with Bennie Wallace
 Heartbop (Enja, 1981)
With Bob Berg
 New Birth (Xanadu, 1978)
With Jerry Bergonzi
 I Ching Reading (Ram)
With Keith Copeland and Kenny Barron
 On Target (Jazz Mania)
With Ted Curson
 I Heard Mingus (Interplay, 1980)
With Miles Davis and Quincy Jones
 Miles & Quincy Live at Montreux (Warner Bros., 1991)
With Buddy DeFranco
 Borinquin (Sonet)
With Jack DeJohnette
 Untitled (ECM, 1976)
 New Rags (ECM, 1977)
With Gil Evans
 Synthetic Evans (Poljazz, 1976)
With Herb Geller
 A Jazz Song Book (Enja, 1987)
With Stan Getz
Another World (Columbia, 1977)
Academy of Jazz (Poljazz, 1978)
Poetry in Jazz (Jazz File, 1977)
Jazzbuhne Berlin '78 (Repertoire)
Utopia (West Wind 1977)
The Best Of Stan Getz (Columbia, 1978)
Academy Of Jazz-with Bob Brookmeyer (Poljazz, 1978)
The Lyrical Stan Getz (Columbia, 1978)
The Essential Stan Getz (Columbia, 1978)
New Collection (Columbia, 1978)
Ballads And Bossa Nova (CBS, 1977)
This Is Jazz (Columbia, 1978)

With George Gruntz
 El Camino (TCB)
 Merryteria (TCB)
 Live at Jazzfest Berlin (TCB)
 First Prize (Enja, 1989)
 Serious Fun (Enja, 1990)
 Blues 'n Dues Et Cetera (Enja, 1991)
 Happening Now (Hat Art) with Joe Henderson, Lee Konitz and Kenny Wheeler
 GGCJB (MPS) with Elvin Jones
 Cosmopolitan Greetings (Migros) with Allen Ginsberg
 Beyond Another Wall: Live in China (TCB)
 Live 82 (Amiga Jazz)
Mock-Lo-Motion (TCB, 1995)
 Sins 'N Wins 'N Funs (TCB)
 Expo Triangle (MGB)
 Global Excellence (TCB)

With Chico Hamilton
 Live at Montreux (Stax, 1973)
With Roland Hanna
 Gershwin, Carmichael & Cats (CTI)
With Tom Harrell
 Aurora (Adamo, 1976)
 Minds Ear (RCA)
With Richie Havens
 The American Game (Arista)
With Daniel Humair
 Surrounded (Flat and Sharp, 1987)
With Vic Juris
 Bleecker St. (Muse, 1981)
With Eric Kloss
 Now (Muse, 1978)
 Celebration (Muse, 1979)
With Jimmy Knepper
1st Place (BlackHawk, 1982 [1986])
With Lee Konitz
 Round and Round (Columbia)
With Ted Curson
I Hear Mingus (Interplay, 1981)
Round Midnight (Generation records, 1983)

With Andy LaVerne
 Mythology (International Phonograph)
 The Spirit of '76 (Four Star, 1976)
 Another World (SteepleChase, 1977)
 Another World Another Time (SteepleChase, 1999)
 Three's Not a Crowd (SteepleChase, 2012)
 Genesis (SteepleChase, 2015)
 Faith (SteepleChase 2016)
 Shangri-La (SteepleChase, 2018)
8 Rhapsody (SteepleChase, 2019)

With Arnie Lawrence
 Renewal (Palo Alto, 1982)
 Treasure Island (Dr. Jazz)
With Hubert Laws
 Say It With Silence (Columbia, 1978) 35022
 A Hero Ain't Nothin' But a Sandwich [Soundtrack] (Columbia, 1978)
 My Time Will Come (Music Casters)

With Jim McNeely
 Winds of Change (SteepleChase)
 Rains Dance (SteepleChase)
 The Plot Thickens (Muse)
 East Side/West Side (Owl)

With Mingus Dynasty
 Live at Montreux (Atlantic, 1980)

With Mingus Big Band Mingus Sings (Sunnyside, 2015)

With Jackie Paris
 Jackie Paris (Audiophile, 1982)
 Nobody Else But Me (Audiophile, 1988)
 Lucky to Be Me (EmArcy, 1989)
 Love Songs (EmArcy, 1990)
 The Intimate Jackie Paris (Hudson, 2000)

With Bobby Paunetto
 Commit to Memory (Pathfinder, 1977)
 Composer in Public (RSVP Jazz)
 Reconstituted (RSVP Jazz)

With Jeanfrançois Prins
 All Around Town (TCB, 1997)

With Dannie Richmond
 Ode to Mingus (Soul Note, 1979)
 Hand to Hand (Soul Note, 1980) with George Adams
 Gentleman's Agreement (Soul Note, 1983) with George Adams

With Larry Schneider
 Just Cole Porter (SteepleChase)
 Blind Date (SteepleChase)
 It Might As Well Be Spring (SteepleChase)

With Ravi Shankar
 Jazzmine (Polydor)
With Ben Sidran
 Life's a Lesson (Go Jazz)
With Marvin Stamm
 Mystery Man (Music Masters)
With Adam UnsworthBalance (AC Records, 2015)With John VanoreStolen Moments (Acoustical Concepts, 2016)
With John Stowell
 Golden Delicious (Inner City, 1977)
With Toshiko Akiyoshi – Lew Tabackin Big Band
 Salted Gingko Nuts (RCA Victor, 1979)
With Lauren HookerLife Of The Music (MHR Records, 2010)All For You My Heart And Soul(MHR Records, 2015)
With Ingrid Sertso/Karl Berger/Don CherryDance With It (Enja, 1983)
With Combo NuvoNouveau Sketches(CN Records, 2002)Far Far From Home(CN Records, 2010)Like I Said (CN Records, 2015)One World Suite (CN Records, 2018)

With Joshua BreakstoneWith The Wind And The Rain (Capri, 2013)2nd Avenue (Capri 2015)88 (Capri, 2016)

With Tom Varner
 Jazz French Horn (Soul Note, 1985)
 Covert Action (New Note, 1987)
 The Mystery of Compassion (Soul Note, 1992)
With Naná Vasconcelos
 Asian Journal (Music of the World, 1981)
With Bennie Wallace
 Sweeping Through the City (Enja, 1984)
With Bill Watrous
 The Tiger of San Pedro (Columbia, 1975)
With Eliot Zigmund
 Dark Street (Freelance)

References
 Craig Harris, [ Mike Richmond] at Allmusic
 William S. Brockman, "Mike Richmond". The New Grove Dictionary of Jazz'', St. Martin's Press, 1994.

American jazz double-bassists
Male double-bassists
Jazz musicians from Pennsylvania
1948 births
Living people
SteepleChase Records artists
Inner City Records artists
21st-century double-bassists
21st-century American male musicians
American male jazz musicians
Mingus Dynasty (band) members